Edge of a Dream is the 22nd album by Scottish folk musician Bert Jansch, released on 8 October 2002.

The title track is given a rock treatment, and two tracks are baroque instrumentals. The remaining songs are roughly equally divided between bluesy numbers and folky ones. The album features Bernard Butler (of Suede) on electric guitar, and Adam Jansch (Bert's son). "Gypsy Dave" is not the well-known folksong, but an instrumental duo with Dave Swarbrick, dedicated to him. Hope Sandoval (of Mazzy Star) sings the lead on "All This Remains", and Loren Jansch takes the lead on "The Quiet Joys of Brotherhood". "Bright Sunny Morning" is a solemn description of the fall of the World Trade Center.

Track listing 
All tracks composed by Bert Jansch; except where indicated

"On the Edge of a Dream" - 2:35
"All This Remains" (Jansch, Hope Sandoval) - 4:43
"What is On Your Mind" - 3:26
"Sweet Death" - 3:52
"I Cannot Keep From Crying" (Traditional) - 4:06
"La Luna" (Johnny "Guitar" Hodge) - 3:15
"Gypsy Dave" - 2:43
"Walking This Road" - 3:16
"The Quiet Joys of Brotherhood" (Richard Fariña, traditional) - 5:31
"Black Cat Blues" - 3:07
"Bright Sunny Morning" - 4:08

Personnel 
Bert Jansch – vocal, acoustic guitar, electric guitar, bass guitar
Bernard Butler – electric guitar on 1 and 5, keyboards on 8
Adam Jansch – bass guitar on 1 and 9
Makoto Sakamoto – drums on 1 and 3
Hope Sandoval – vocals on 2
Colm Ó Cíosóig – drums on 2
Dave Swarbrick – violin on 4 and 7
Johnny "Guitar" Hodge – Spanish guitar on 5
Loren Jansch – vocals on 9
Paul Wassif – slide guitar on 10
Ralph McTell – harmonica on 11

References

External links 
https://web.archive.org/web/20070621083639/http://www.bertjansch.com/edgeofa.html

Bert Jansch albums
2002 albums
Sanctuary Records albums